Joseph Whipple III (July 3, 1725 – 1761) was a merchant in the Colony of Rhode Island and Providence Plantations, and a Deputy Governor of the colony.

The son of Deputy Governor Joseph Whipple Jr. who was a very wealthy merchant, Whipple was born in Newport, the second of nine children.  He must have had very good political connections because he became Deputy Governor at the remarkable age of 25, but two years later he became financially insolvent, and was forced to give up his position in 1753.  He had to sell the farm left to him in his father's will and liquidate other properties to pay his debts.  Many ship owners went bankrupt in the middle of the 18th century.  The use of paper money got part of the blame for this, but the protracted war with Spain and France had a major impact on commerce.  The young and inexperienced Whipple had not yet developed the business acumen to avert these financial difficulties.

After resigning his position as Deputy Governor in 1753, Whipple led a short and anguished life.  In 1761, his obituary in the local newspaper, the Newport Mercury, stated "Joseph Whipple, former Dep.Govr. Facted, became intemperate, and was drowned from the Point Bridge, while returning from the theatre on the Point."  He is not known to have ever married, nor have any children.

See also

 List of lieutenant governors of Rhode Island
 List of colonial governors of Rhode Island
 Colony of Rhode Island and Providence Plantations

References

Bibliography

Further reading

External links
State list of lieutenant governors of Rhode Island

1725 births
1761 deaths
Politicians from Newport, Rhode Island
People of colonial Rhode Island